Sanchai Ratiwatana and Sonchat Ratiwatana were the defending champions, but lost in the quarterfinals.

Daniel Muñoz de la Nava and Aleksandr Nedovyesov won the title, defeating Fabrice Martin and Purav Raja in the final, 6–2, 7–5.

Seeds

Draw

References
 Main Draw

China International Guangzhou - Doubles
China International Guangzhou